John A. O'Neill (c. 1837 – June 17, 1892) was an American steel engraver and Democratic party politician. He served as the 15th Mayor of Hoboken, New Jersey.

Biography
He served as a member of the New Jersey General Assembly in 1872; served three terms on the Hudson County Board of Chosen Freeholders in 1869, 1870, and 1873; and one term as the fifteenth mayor of Hoboken, New Jersey from 1880 to 1881. He was appointed by President Grover Cleveland as the superintendent of the Engraving Division of the Bureau of Engraving and Printing in 1885 and served there until his death in 1892.

References

1892 deaths
County commissioners in New Jersey
Democratic Party members of the New Jersey General Assembly
Mayors of Hoboken, New Jersey
Year of birth uncertain